Birds Barbershop is an independently owned brand of barbershops founded in Austin, Texas, USA. The first shop was opened in 2006 by Jayson Rapaport and Michael Portman with the goal to provide low cost salon services for both men and women in a casual rock club environment.

History
Michael Portman left his job at Disney and moved to Austin, Texas where he met Jayson Rapaport who had recently left a career as a Wall Street trader. They created Birds as an alternative to salons and chain hair-cutters. 

Each of their nine local shops is built around a large-scale mural painted by a local artist and has a stage for live music. Portman and Rapaport named it Birds Barbershop as a direct appeal to women.

Design
Each Birds Barbershop has an independent color theme. Some locations have retro decor and others have sports themes. Each location has a large wall mural.

Awards
One of America's 100 Best Salons - Elle, six consecutive years
Best in the Beauty Business - Austin Monthly
Best Beauty Salon - Austin A List, 2007
Best of Austin 21 awards
Austin Chronicle's 'Best Haircut'

References

External links
Official website
Related Website for More Austin Salon

Hairdressing salon chains
American companies established in 2006
Retail companies established in 2006
Retail companies of the United States
Companies based in Austin, Texas
2006 establishments in Texas